Nicole Cutler (née Westdyk; born 8 June 1972) is a professional ballroom dancer and former World Amateur Latin-American champion. She was born Nicole Westdyk in Durban, South Africa and after taking up ballet at the age of four, first tried out ballroom and Latin-American dancing at the age of twelve.

Career
In South Africa she danced competitively with Andrew Magin and Warren Smith before moving to the UK in 1990. In 1994 she teamed up with British dancer Matthew Cutler and they were married in 1996. They divorced in 2003, but have recently been dancing non-competitively once again, still using her married name. In 1999 they formed the principal couple in the stage show Burn the Floor. Jay Park was her professional partner from November 2003 to June 2004. They came first in the Professional Latin All England Championship in May 2004. Nicole partnered Robin Sewell from June 2005 to June 2006. They were runners-up in the closed British Championships and ranked second in England. She twice received the Carl Alan Award for "outstanding contributions to dance".

She has appeared as a professional dancer on Strictly Come Dancing. In series two, she partnered Diarmuid Gavin, then took a break from the show. However, she returned in series four to partner Nicholas Owen, and John Barnes in series five.

Titles

Professional
 All England Professional Champion 2004
 World, Open British, International and UK Professional Latin finalist, 2000–2003
 UK Closed Professional Latin Champion, 2000, 2002
 World Masters Professional Latin Champion, 2000

Amateur
 UK Open Amateur Champion 2000
 Open British Amateur Champions 1997, 1999
 World, European & International Amateur Champion 1999
 Closed British Amateur Champions 1995, 1996, 1997, 1999
 Closed UK Amateur Champions 1995, 1996, 1997, 1998, 1999
 Dutch Open Amateur Latin Champions 1998, 1999
 South African Open Amateur Champions 1990, 1994

References

External links 
Nicole Cutler - official page

1972 births
Living people
British female dancers
British ballroom dancers